Ocypode ceratophthalmus, the horned ghost crab or horn-eyed ghost crab, is a species of ghost crab. It lives in the Indo-Pacific region (except the Red Sea); from the coast of East Africa to the Philippines and from Japan to the Great Barrier Reef. They also occur in the Pacific Islands to as far east as Polynesia and Clipperton Island. As their common name implies, O. ceratophthalmus possess eyestalks extending beyond the eyes into long points, which are longer in adults, and shorter (or even absent) in juveniles.

The characteristic "horned" eyes of O. ceratophthalmus are not unique to the species, and it should not be confused with other ghost crabs which also exhibit "horns" on the end of their eyestalks such as O. cursor, O. gaudichaudii, O. macrocera, O. mortoni, O. rotundata, and O. saratan.

Gallery

References

Further reading

External links

 

Ocypodoidea
Crustaceans described in 1772
Taxa named by Peter Simon Pallas